Arabacı Ali Pasha (also known as Bahadırzade Ali Pasha; 1620–1693) was a short-term Albanian Ottoman grand vizier from 1691 to 1692. His epithet arabacı means "charioteer" in Turkish, an allusion to his practice of sending his political enemies to death or exile in a certain tumbrel.

Early years 
He was born in Ohrid (in modern North Macedonia) of Albanian ethnicity. After serving in various government offices, he became a subordinate of Köprülü Fazıl Mustafa Pasha, who was appointed as a grand vizier. The empire was engaged in Great Turkish War. Fazıl Mustafa Pasha temporarily halted Austrian advance but was killed in action during the Battle of Slankamen. Five days later, Ahmet II, the sultan appointed Ali Pasha as the new grand vizier.

As grand vizier 
Ali Pasha was expected to command the army like his predecessor and mentor Köprülü Fazıl Mustafa Pasha had done. However, Ali Pasha preferred to stay in the capital, contributing to the Ottoman defeats. His inattentiveness to military affairs and harsh methods (including death sentences) towards his potential opponents caused him to lose the support of the sultan. On 21 March 1692, he was deposed.

Final days and death
Ali Pasha was first exiled to Gelibolu (a port on the Dardanelles strait, in modern Turkey) and then to the island of Rhodes (in modern Greece). However, when a rumor reached the sultan in Istanbul that he had plans return (or revolt), he was executed in Rhodes in 1693.

See also
 List of Ottoman Grand Viziers

References

17th-century Grand Viziers of the Ottoman Empire
1693 deaths
1620 births
People from Ohrid
Executed people from the Ottoman Empire
17th-century executions by the Ottoman Empire
Albanian Grand Viziers of the Ottoman Empire
Albanian Pashas
Albanians from the Ottoman Empire
Albanians in North Macedonia
17th-century Albanian people
Military personnel of the Ottoman Empire